Chromium(II) iodide is the inorganic compound with the formula CrI2.  It is a red-brown or black solid.  The compound is made by thermal decomposition of chromium(III) iodide. Like many metal diiodides, CrI2 adopts the "cadmium iodide structure" motif, i.e., it features sheets of octahedral Cr(II) centers interconnected by bridging iodide ligands. Reflecting the effects of its d4 configuration, chromium's coordination sphere is highly distorted.

Treatment of chromium powder with concentrated hydroiodic acid gives a blue hydrated chromium(II) iodide, which can be converted to related acetonitrile complexes.
Cr +  nH2O  +  2HI  →   CrI2(H2O)n  +  H2

References

Chromium(II) compounds
Iodides
Metal halides